Sarvabhoumudu is a 1989 Indian Telugu-language action film directed by S. S. Ravichandra starring Krishna and Radha in the lead roles with a musical score by Chakravarthy.
 The film was released on 1 September 1989.

Cast 
 Krishna
 Radha
 Kaikala Satyanarayana
 Gollapudi Maruthi Rao
 Kota Srinivasa Rao
 Mallikarjuna Rao

Soundtrack

Release and Reception 
The film was released on 1 September.

References 

1980s Telugu-language films
1989 films
Films directed by S. S. Ravichandra